The 2020 László Killik Női Magyar Kupa is the 63rd season of the Hungarian Basketball Cup.

Qualification
Eight highest ranked teams after the first half of the 2019–20 NB I/A regular season qualified to the tournament.

Sopron Basket
Aluinvent DVTK
ZTE Női Kosárlabda Klub
Atomerőmű KSC Szekszárd
PEAC-Pécs
Uni Győr MÉLY-ÚT
NKE-FCSM Csata
TFSE MTK

Bracket

Semifinals

Bronze match

Final

Final standings

See also
 2019–20 Nemzeti Bajnokság I/A

References

External links
 Official website
 Hungarian Basketball Federaration

Magyar Kupa women